Im Dong-jae (born July 2, 1981), better known professionally as Kwon Hyun-sang, is a South Korean actor.

Career
Kwon Hyun-Sang made his acting debut in the 2008 horror movie Death Bell, which was followed by supporting roles in several films and television series. Then in 2013, he played his first leading role in the indie comedy Let Me Out.

Kwon also appeared in a bit part in Hanji, which was directed by his father, acclaimed film director Im Kwon-Taek. His mother is retired actress Chae Ryung.

Filmography

Films

Television series

Music videos

Theater

References

External links
 
 
 

1981 births
Male actors from Seoul
South Korean male film actors
South Korean male television actors
Living people